Homer Gudelsky was a prominent real estate developer and philanthropist in the Baltimore-Washington area who helped develop Tysons Corner Center, Westfield Wheaton, and other major shopping malls, as well as much of the waterfront in West Ocean City. One of the wealthiest people in the region, Gudelsky made his fortune  mining sand and gravel and constructing roads. A 1963 sale of land in Howard County to James Rouse allowed the Rouse Company to begin construction of the planned community of Columbia.

Life
Gudelsky's father Abraham was a Polish-Jewish immigrant who had found success as a junk dealer in Baltimore. He had a wife named Martha; four children: Rita Regino, Medda Gudelsky, Holly Stone and John Gudelsky; and seven grandchildren. After 1974, Gudelsky moved to Boca Raton, Florida. Gudelsky died from leukemia in 1989 at age 78.

During the 1970s and the 1980s, a bitter fight among the Gudelsky family was waged in the courts. Homer and his brother Isadore together had created the Contee Sand & Gravel Co., later renamed Percontee. Following Isadore's death in 1963, his widow Bertha accused Homer of improperly withholding Isadore's $4 million dollar Contee share for 5 years before distributing it to her. Bertha Gudelsky filed a lawsuit in 1973 alleging losses between 1963 and 1968. The case was brought to trial in Baltimore in November 1983. The case was dismissed in February 1984 after Bertha Gudelsky decided to drop the lawsuit.

Legacy
In 1964, with the help of Gudelsky, the B'nai Israel Congregation acquired land for educational center at the intersection of Georgia Avenue and Evans Drive in Wheaton, Maryland. In 1967, the center opened as the Paul Himmelfarb Hebrew School of Congregation B'nai Israel.

The Homer and Martha Gudelsky Foundation, a philanthropy organization, was founded by Gudelsky in 1968.

References

External links
The Collingtonian: A monthly publication of the Collington Residents Association, February 2008

1989 deaths
American Ashkenazi Jews
American businesspeople
American people of Polish-Jewish descent
Deaths from leukemia
Jewish American philanthropists
People from Baltimore
People from Boca Raton, Florida
People from Silver Spring, Maryland